The San Diego Sockers 2 is an American professional indoor soccer team based in San Diego, California, formed in 2017 with the Major Arena Soccer League 2, the MASL's developmental league. Like its parent club, the San Diego Sockers, its home field is in Pechanga Arena and it is run by CEO David Pike. The head coaches were Rene Ortiz and Ray Taila.

History
Sockers 2 was created in 2017 to develop prospects for the San Diego Sockers.  They played their only two seasons in the same arena as that parent club, the Pechanga Arena San Diego in San Diego. They went 7–5 in the regular season in 2018 and 2–1 in the playoffs, winning the first M2 Western Conference Championship. They advanced to the inaugural M2 Cup, falling to the eventual champions, the Chicago Mustangs, 7–0.  They captured the M2 Championship in 2019 with a 7–5 victory over Cuervos de Juarez, and folded shortly thereafter.

On June 24, 2021, M2 announced Sockers 2 will return in the 2021–2022 season.

Players

References

External links
San Diego Sockers 2 official website
Major Arena Soccer League 2 official website

 
2017 establishments in California
Association football clubs established in 2017
Indoor soccer clubs in the United States
Sports in San Diego